The 2009–10 Kent State Golden Flashes men's basketball team represented Kent State University in the 2009–10 college basketball season. The team was coached by Geno Ford and played their home games in the Memorial Athletic and Convocation Center. They are members of the Mid-American Conference. They finished the season 24–10, 13–3 in MAC play to win the east division and overall regular season championship. As the 1 seed they were upset by 9 seed and eventual champion Ohio in the quarterfinals of the 2010 MAC men's basketball tournament. As regular season champions they received an automatic bid to the 2010 National Invitation Tournament where they advanced to the second round before falling to Illinois.

Before the season

Roster changes
The Golden Flashes lost four seniors from their 2008–09 roster.  These seniors include the starters Al Fisher, Jordan Mincy, and Julian Sullinger.  Fisher was the team's leading scorer, averaging 14.4 points per game.  The team also lost Rashad Woods, who was suspended last year due to a violation of team rules.

To compensate for the team's losses, four new players joined the Flashes for the 2009–10 basketball season.  Only one of these four players is a freshman, while one sophomore and two juniors are recruits from junior colleges.

Recruiting

Roster 
Roster current as of June 25, when their summer prospectus was published.

Coaching staff

Schedule 

|-
!colspan=9| Exhibition

|-
!colspan=9| Regular Season

|-
!colspan=9| 2010 MAC men's basketball tournament

|-
!colspan=9| 2010 National Invitation Tournament

After the season

Awards 
On March 8, 2010, head coach Geno Ford was named the Mid-American Conference Coach of the Year, the seventh time a KSU coach has won the award (Jim McDonald, 1990; Gary Waters, 1999 and 2000; Stan Heath, 2002; and Jim Christian, 2006 and 2008).  He was selected by three votes over Keith Dambrot of Akron.

References

Kent State Golden Flashes men's basketball seasons
Kent State Golden Flashes
Kent State
Kent State
Kent State